Stop Out Sports Club, commonly known as Stop Out, is an association football club in Lower Hutt, New Zealand is based at Hutt Park, Moera in Lower Hutt.

History
The Stop Out organisation started in 1919 with the aim of providing recreation to Te Aro Flat children in Wellington associated with the Wellington City Mission so as to prevent them becoming "stop outs" - period slang for "troubled youth". 
The club has been involved in a myriad of sports, including Boxing, Athletics and Softball; however, these days football is the heart and soul of the club.

Despite the change of sporting-code focus, the club highly values the founding principles and continues to abide by them. The football branch, established in 1929 as the club Moera Stop Out, changed its name to Stop Out in 1932. The club won the Chatham Cup in 1956, and was runner-up in the National League in 1977. In 1983 and 1984 Stop Out won the Central League  title.

In the 2006 season the club's men's first team played in Central League for the first time in over a decade however at the 2008 season the team was relegated again to the Capital Premier League. After promotion in 2014, they once again played in the Central League

In men's football Stop Out were the 2014 Capital Premier League champions, a title they also won in 2013.

The Women's first team has also won the Capital Premier Women's League in 2011 and again in 2013 as well as being runners-up in the Kelly Cup in 2015.

References

External links
 
 Capital Football profile
 "Ultimate New Zealand Soccer" website

Association football clubs in Wellington
Association football clubs established in 1922
1922 establishments in New Zealand
Sport in Lower Hutt